The Field Artillery Rationalisation Plan is a procurement-cum-development plan of the Indian Army proposed in the aftermath of the Kargil War, emboldened by the success of the 155mm Bofors guns in its inventory. The procurement involves direct import, manufacture under license and inhouse development of weapon systems. The programme is slated to replace the weapons of 169 artillery regiments with modern weapon systems, predominantly 155mm medium guns.

Under the Field Artillery Rationalisation Plan, the army plans to procure 3000 to 3600 pieces of artillery, at a cost of US$3 billion. This includes purchasing 1580 towed, 814 mounted, 180 self-propelled wheeled, 100 self-propelled tracked and 145 ultra-light 155 mm/52 calibre artillery guns.

Ultra-light Howitzers 
After three years of searching and negotiations, India ordered M777 155  ultra-light howitzer from USA in September 2013.

India's Ministry of Defence cleared the proposal for buying 145 guns for US$660 million on 11 May 2012 through the US Government's Foreign Military Sales (FMS) process. This was put up before the Ministry of Finance for clearance and will subsequently be taken up by the Cabinet Committee on Security for final approval. On 2 August 2013, India requested the sale of 145 M777 howitzers for US$885 million. On 24 February 2014 the purchase was again postponed. On 11 May 2014 the purchase was cleared by India's Ministry of Defence. On 11 July 2014, the Government of India announced that it would not order the guns because of cost issues. On 22 November 2014, the selection process was restarted under the "Make In India" program. On 13 May 2015, the Ministry of Defence approved ₹29 billion (₹2,900 crore) to buy 145 M777 ultralight howitzers from the US. On 15 December 2015, the Indian Ministry of Defence said it was keen on placing a follow-up order of 500 more M777 guns.

On 26 June 2016, it was announced that 145 guns will be purchased by India for US$750 million. On 30 November 2016 Indian government completed the deal to buy 145 howitzers from the US. The deal was completed in December 2016. Under the agreement, BAE Systems supplied 25 ready-built howitzers, while 120 guns were manufactured in India by Mahindra Defence Systems Limited.

The Indian Army received its first shipment comprising two howitzers on 18 May 2017 in New Delhi from United States in ready to use condition. It was reported that on 2 September 2017, the barrel of one of the howitzers was damaged while firing during calibration trials. The Indian army used the M777 howitzer in the Himvijay exercise in Arunachal Pradesh which involved the newly raised integrated battle groups.

A total of 7 artillery regiments are planned, each of 18 guns. The first regiment is planned to be raised by end-2020 with 15 guns supplied by BAE systems and three guns supplied by Mahindra Defense Systems Limited.

In July 2020, in the wake of escalating tension with China in light of hostile Chinese posturing, particularly on the border between the Union Territory of Ladakh and Chinese-occupied Tibet, further purchases of Excalibur shells were announced by the Indian Ministry of Defence.

References

Military of India
Artillery of India